Oleg Vladislavovich Stoyanovskiy (born 26 September 1996) is a Russian beach volleyball player.

He and Viacheslav Krasilnikov won 2019 Beach Volleyball World Championships in Hamburg, defeating Julius Thole and Clemens Wickler of Germany. Stoyanovskiy also became the youngest World champion, with 22 years, 9 months, and 11 days.

References

External links

1996 births
Living people
Russian beach volleyball players
Sportspeople from Moscow
Beach volleyball players at the 2014 Summer Youth Olympics
Youth Olympic gold medalists for Russia
Beach volleyball players at the 2020 Summer Olympics
Olympic silver medalists for the Russian Olympic Committee athletes
Medalists at the 2020 Summer Olympics
Olympic medalists in beach volleyball